Paulo César Francisco Pinheiro (born 28 April 1949) is a Brazilian poet and composer. One of the best poets of Musica Popular Brasileira, he wrote lyrics for a great number of songs for some of the best-known entertainers in Brazil. Among his collaborators have been João Nogueira, João de Aquino, Francis Hime, Dori Caymmi, Antônio Carlos Jobim, Ivan Lins, Edu Lobo, Mauro Duarte, Guinga, Baden Powell de Aquino, Toquinho, Eduardo Gudin e Maria Bethânia.

Discography
 Poesia Musicada (2011) - album by Dori Caymmi to celebrate 42 years working with Paulo César Pinheiro 
 Capoeira De Besouro (Junho 2010)
 O Lamento do Samba (2003)
 Tudo o que mais nos uniu - Eduardo Gudin, Márcia e Paulo César Pinheiro (1996)
 Parceria - João Nogueira e Paulo César Pinheiro - Ao Vivo (1994)
 Afros e Afoxés da Bahia (1989)
 Poemas Escolhidos (1983)
 O importante é que a nossa emoção sobreviva n. 2 (1976)
 O importante é que a nossa emoção sobreviva (1975)

Books
 Canto Brasileiro (1973)
 Viola Morena (1984)
 Atabaques, Violas e Bambus (2000)
 Clave de Sal
 Pontal do Pilar (2009)

References

External links

1949 births
Brazilian male poets
Brazilian songwriters
Musicians from Rio de Janeiro (city)
Living people
20th-century Brazilian male writers
20th-century Brazilian poets